The Juno Awards of 1971 (Juno Award), representing Canadian music industry achievements of the previous year, were awarded on 22 February 1971 in Toronto at a ceremony in the St. Lawrence Hall. These would be the first awards to be formally titled the Junos as decided by RPM Magazine in 1970 following its first formal music awards event. George Wilson of CFRB radio was master of ceremonies for the awards for the second consecutive year.

Atlantic Canadians were particularly successful at the awards in 1971, most notably producer Brian Ahern and artists Stompin' Tom Connors, Gene MacLellan and Anne Murray, prompting Murray to quip to the audience about the emergence of a "Maritime Mafia" in the Canadian music scene. Connors would go on to win several more Junos before returning them in protest of the awards honoring Canadian musicians who primarily make their career outside of Canada.

Nominated and winning people

Best Female Vocalist
Winner: Anne Murray

Other nominees:
 Susan Jacks
 Debbie Lori Kaye
 Joni Mitchell
 Ginette Reno

Best Male Vocalist
Winner: Gordon Lightfoot

Other nominees:
 Andy Kim
 Pierre Lalonde
 Gene MacLellan
 Tom Northcott

Best Group
Winner: The Guess Who

Other nominees:
 Edward Bear
 Lighthouse
 Mashmakhan
 The Poppy Family

Best Songwriter
Winner: Gene MacLellan (Special Award: Canadian Composer)

Best Country Female Artist
Winner: Myrna Lorrie

Other nominees:
 Debbie Lori Kaye
 Dianne Leigh
 Julie Lynn
 Donna Ramsay

Best Country Male Artist
Winner: Stompin' Tom Connors

Other nominees:
 Gary Buck
 Dick Damron
 Tommy Hunter
 Hank Smith

Best Country Group or Duo
Winner: The Mercey Brothers

Other nominees:
 The Chaparrals
 The Hickorys
 The Rainvilles
 Rhythm Pals

Top Folk Singer
Winner: Bruce Cockburn

Other nominees:
 Great Speckled Bird
 Anthony Green and Barry Stagg
 Joni Mitchell
 Tom Northcott

Music industry Man of the Year
Winner: Pierre Juneau

Broadcaster of the Year
Winner: Standard Broadcasting, noted for its Canadian Talent Library

Top Canadian Content Company of the Year
Winner: Quality Records

Other nominees:
 Capitol Records
 Columbia Records
 London Records
 RCA Records

Top Record Company of the Year
Winner: Capitol Records

Other nominees:
 Columbia Records
 Quality Records
 RCA Records
 Warner Bros. Records

Top Promotional Company of the Year
Winner: Capitol Records

Other nominees:
 Columbia Records
 Quality Records
 RCA Records
 Warner Bros. Records

Journalist of the Year
Winner: Dave Bist, Montreal Gazette

Nominated and winning albums

Best Produced Album
Winner: Honey, Wheat and Laughter, Anne Murray (producer Brian Ahern)

Other nominees:
 Make Someone Happy, Tom and Judy
 Sit Down Young Stranger, Gordon Lightfoot
 This Way Is My Way, Anne Murray
 Young Years, Pierre Lalonde

Nominated and winning releases

Best Produced Single
Winner: "Snowbird" by Anne Murray (producer Brian Ahern)

Other nominees:
 "American Woman", The Guess Who
 "As the Years Go By", Mashmakhan
 "Fly Little White Dove, Fly", The Bells
 "If You're Lookin'", Tranquility Base

References 
Citations

Bibliography

 

Other
RPM, Juno Awards Special Issue, 27 February 1971

External links
Juno Awards official site

1971
1971 music awards
1971 in Canadian music